Kozárovice is a municipality and village in Příbram District in the Central Bohemian Region of the Czech Republic. It has about 400 inhabitants.

Administrative parts
Villages of Holušice and Vystrkov are administrative parts of Kozárovice.

References

Villages in Příbram District